The Fuerza Regia de Monterrey (Monterrey Royal Force in English) is a Mexican professional basketball team based in Monterrey, Nuevo Leon, Mexico playing in the Liga Nacional de Baloncesto Profesional (LNBP). They currently play their home games in the Gimnasio Nuevo León.

Franchise history

2007-2008 
The team finished second in the 2007–08 LNBP Northern Zone division standings only behind Lobos Grises UAD, but failed to advance to the Northern Zone Finals after losing to the Soles de Mexicali which advanced to the LNBP final.

2016-2017 
Fuerza Regia finished first on the league table and qualified to the playoffs. The team won its first championship by defeating Soles de Mexicali 4–2 in the finals.

International tournaments
On December 4, 2007, Fuerza Regia was one of the 16 teams to participate in the first annual FIBA Americas League in Mexicali, Baja California, Mexico that ended on February 9, 2008. Argentina's Peñarol Mar del Plata won the competition and LNBP's Soles de Mexicali were the runner-up, while Fuerza Regia finished in 9th place.

Honours
Liga Nacional de Baloncesto Profesional: (4)
2017, 2019, 2020, 2021

Logos

Home arenas
Arena Monterrey (2003–2008)
Nuevo Leon Gimnasium (2008-2013)
Gimnasio Nuevo León Independiente (2013-present)

Players

Current roster

Notable former players

NBA Chicago Bulls superstar Dennis Rodman was signed for three games and played for at least thirty minutes.

Fuerza Regia's Jamario Moon was signed by the NBA's Toronto Raptors for the 2007–08 and 2008–2009 season, and later played for other NBA teams. Altogether, he played more than 300 NBA games.

On April 25, 2007, Fuerza Regia signed Chinese basketball player Sun Mingming, the world's tallest active basketballer at 7' 9".

List

See also
Liga Nacional de Baloncesto Profesional
FIBA Americas League

References

External links
Fuerza Regia official site
Liga Nacional de Baloncesto Professional
FIBA Americas League

Basketball teams in Mexico
Basketball teams established in 2001
2001 establishments in Mexico
Sports teams in Monterrey